An Awful Moment is a 1908 American silent short drama film directed by D. W. Griffith. A print of the "one-reeler" is preserved in the film archive of the Library of Congress.

Plot
Judge Mowbray sentences a man, at which a gypsy woman protests. The Judge later goes home and sees his wife and daughter. However the gypsy woman breaks into his house. She knocks out Mrs. Mowbray, gags her and ties her to a chair. She sets up a gun to shoot her dead when the door is opened. However the daughter wakes up and is able to tell her father, who saves his wife, and the gypsy woman is arrested.

Cast
 George Gebhardt as Matteo Rettazzi / Policeman
 Marion Leonard as Fiammetta, Matteo's Wife
 Harry Solter as Judge Mowbray
 Florence Lawrence as Mrs. Mowbray
 Gladys Egan as The Mowbrays' Daughter
 Linda Arvidson as The Maid
 Florence Barker
 Dorothy Bernard
 Kate Bruce
 Charles Gorman
 Gertrude Robinson as Woman in Court
 Mack Sennett as Policeman / Man in Court
 Dorothy West

References

External links
 

1908 films
1908 drama films
1908 short films
Silent American drama films
American silent short films
American black-and-white films
Films directed by D. W. Griffith
Articles containing video clips
1900s American films
American drama short films
1900s English-language films